Patricia Breen is an American television writer and producer, who has worked on a range of shows including Frasier and the acclaimed HBO polygamy drama Big Love.

Career 
Breen began her writing career on the tenth season of Frasier. She worked as a story editor on the eleventh and final season while also contributing two scripts. In 2006 she wrote a pilot script for ABC called Pink Collar starring Alicia Silverstone. The pilot was not successful in securing a series order. In 2009 she joined the writing staff of Big Love for its third season. She was a co-producer in season four and a producer in its fifth and final season. She contributed one script each season.

Television episodes by Breen

Frasier 
 We Two Kings (10.10)
 Some Assembly Required (10.19)
 Sea Bea Jeebies (11.10)
 Frasier-Lite (11.12)

Big Love 
 Fight of Flight (3.7)
 Next Ticket Out (4.8)
 The Special Relationship (5.5)

Suburgatory 
 Don’t Call Me Shirley (1.4)
 The Nutcracker (1.9)
 The Body (1.14)
 Entering Eden (1.19)
 Black Thai (2.8)
 T-Ball & Sympathy (2.14)
 Brown Trembler (2.18)

References

External links 

American television writers
American television producers
American women television producers
Living people
American women television writers
Place of birth missing (living people)
Year of birth missing (living people)
21st-century American women